Puffer is a surname. Notable people with the surname include:

Alfred Puffer (1840–1875)
Brandon Puffer (born 1975), American baseball player
Ethel Dench Puffer Howes (1872–1950), American psychologist and feminist
Fred Puffer (c. 1871 – 1900), American track and field athlete
Ruth Rice Puffer (1907–2002), American biostatistician
Ted Puffer (1928–2003), American singer, voice teacher and translator
William Puffer (1861–1948), Canadian politician